The .461 No 1 Gibbs and the .461 No 2 Gibbs are two obsolete proprietary rifle cartridges developed in 19th century Britain.

Design
The .461 No 1 Gibbs and the .461 No 2 Gibbs are both rimmed, bottlenecked centerfire rifle cartridges designed for use with blackpowder.  Both cartridges were offered with two loadings, when loaded with the lighter both cartridges were considered expresses.

.461 No 1 Gibbs

.461 No 2 Gibbs
The .461 No 2 Gibbs, also known as the .461 No 2 Gibbs  inch, was based on the No 1 cartridge case with a lengthened neck.

History
Both cartridges were developed by Bristol gunmaker George Gibbs for use in his Gibbs–Farquharson–Metford single shot rifles built on the Farquharson falling block action, although Gibbs also built double rifles with Metford barrels chambering these cartridges.  The .461 No 1 Gibbs was designed around 1879–80, whilst the .461 No 2 Gibbs was designed around 1890.

Both cartridges were subsequently loaded with mild loadings of smokeless cordite, carefully balanced to replicate the ballistics of the original black powder versions, to become the .461 No 1 Gibbs Nitro for Black and the .461 No 2 Gibbs Nitro for Black, but unlike other similar black powder cartridges of their era, neither became a Nitro Express cartridges.

Use
Both the .461 No 1 Gibbs and the .461 No 2 Gibbs were designed as match rifle cartridges for long range target shooting although both cartridges gained popularity as hunting cartridges.

Frederick Selous used a Gibbs–Farquharson–Metford rifle chambered in .461 No 1 Gibbs extensively in Africa.  With this rifle he shot elephant, lion, giraffe, buffalo, hippopotamus, rhinoceros, zebra and numerous species of antelope.

Frederick Vaughan Kirby hunted extensively in southern Africa with several .461 Gibbs rifles, including at least one Gibbs–Farquharson–Metford rifle chambered in .461 No 1 Gibbs and a Gibbs–Metford double rifle chambered in .461 No 2 Gibbs regulated for the 570 gr loading. With these rifles he shot rhinoceros, buffalo, hippopotamus, lion, leopard and various antelope, stating that the .461 Gibbs was "perhaps as perfect a weapon for lion-shooting as one can desire". Kirby also shot elephant with these rifles, although stated elephant should only be killed with small bore rifles under special circumstances.

Notes

See also
 Express (weaponry)
 List of rifle cartridges
 11 mm caliber

References

External links

 Cartridgecollector, ".461 No. 1 Gibbs ", cartridgecollector.net, retrieved 23 October 2017.
 Cartridgecollector, ".461 No. 2 Gibbs ", cartridgecollector.net, retrieved 23 October 2017.

Pistol and rifle cartridges
British firearm cartridges
George Gibbs cartridges